Galerida is a genus of birds in the family Alaudidae. The current scientific name is derived from Latin. Galerida was the name for a lark with a crest, from galerum, "cap". The name Galerida is synonymous with the earlier genus names Calendula, Heliocorys and Ptilocorys.

Taxonomy and systematics
The genus Galerida was established by the German zoologist Friedrich Boie in 1828. The type species was subsequently designated as the crested lark.

Extant species
The genus contains seven species:

Extinct species
There are at least two fossil species which are included in this genus:
 †Galerida bulgarica (late Pliocene of Varshets, Bulgaria)
 †Galerida pannonica (Pliocene of Csarnota, Hungary)

Former species
Formerly, some authorities also considered the following species (or subspecies) as species within the genus Galerida:
 Short-tailed lark (as Galerida fremantlii)
 Dunn's lark (as Calendula dunni)

References

 
Bird genera